David Chapin is an American sailor, 3 time World Champion in the Sunfish and Snipe classes, gold medalist at the Pan American Games, and winner of multiple North American and United States Championships in Sunfish, Snipe, Laser, 470 and Soling classes.

He was U.S. Singlehanded Champion in 1977, sailed in Laser.

In 1978 he was second at the Sunfish World Championship.

In 1979 he won the Snipe World Championship, the Sunfish World Championship, the Snipe North American Championship, and the United States Snipe National Championship.

In 1980 he won the Snipe Western Hemisphere & Orient Championship, and was second at the Sunfish World Championship.
 
In 1981 he won again the Sunfish World Championship, and the United States Snipe National Championship.

In 1982 he was third at the Sunfish World Championship, and won his second Snipe Western Hemisphere & Orient Championship, and his third United States Snipe National Championship.

In 1987 he won the gold medal at the Pan American Games.

He is of English ancestry being a direct descendant of Deacon Samuel Chapin.

References

External links
 

Year of birth missing (living people)
Living people
American male sailors (sport)
Pan American Games gold medalists for the United States
Pan American Games medalists in sailing
Sailors at the 1987 Pan American Games
Medalists at the 1987 Pan American Games
Snipe class world champions
Sunfish class world champions
World champions in sailing for the United States
Texas Longhorns sailors